William Blackwood (20 November 177616 September 1834) was a Scottish publisher who founded the firm of William Blackwood and Sons.

Life

Blackwood was born in Edinburgh on 20 November 1776. At the age of 14 he was apprenticed to a firm of booksellers in Edinburgh, and he followed his calling also in Glasgow and London for several years. Returning to Edinburgh in 1804, he opened a shop in South Bridge Street for the sale of old, rare and curious books. He undertook the Scottish agency for John Murray and other London publishers, and gradually drifted into publishing on his own account, moving in 1816 to Princes Street. On 1 April 1817 the first number of the Edinburgh Monthly Magazine was published, which on its seventh number became Blackwood's Edinburgh Magazine. "Maga," as this magazine soon came to be called, was the organ of the Scottish Tory party, and round it gathered a host of  writers, including John Neal, making Maga the first British literary journal to publish work by an American.

In 1829 he wrote to his son William in India telling him that he was moving from Princes Street to 45 George Street as George Street was "becoming more and more a place of business and the east end of Princes Street is now like Charring Cross, a mere place for coaches". His brother Thomas bought 43 George and in 1830 Thomas Hamilton remodelled the entire frontage of the pair for the Blackwood Brothers. Thomas' shop operated as a silk merchant.

At the end of his life Blackwood was living at 3 Ainslie Place on Edinburgh's elegant Moray Estate in the West End. His bookshop was within easy walking distance, being located at 45 George Street.

William Blackwood died in 1834 and is buried in an ornate vault in the lower western section of Old Calton Burial Ground.

In fiction
The character Oakstick in John Paterson's Mare, James Hogg's allegorical satire on the Edinburgh publishing scene, is based on William Blackwood.

Family

William Blackwood married Janet Steuart (1780–1849) on 29 October 1805. They had a large family. Most of his sons joined his publishing firm in some capacity. All are buried with him at the Old Calton Burial Ground except where stated:

Alexander Blackwood (1806–1845)
Robert Blackwood (1808–1852)
Major William Blackwood (1810–1861) came later into the publishing business after a military beginning.
Isabella Blackwood (1812–1897)
James Blackwood (1814–1871)
Thomas Blackwood (1816–1855) (buried in Boulogne)
John Blackwood (1819–1879) who took over editorship of Blackwood's Magazine (buried in Dean Cemetery)
Col Archibald Blackwood (1821–1870) adopted a military career, died in Simla in India.
Janet Blackwood (1823–1870), married Archibald Smith and moved to London (buried in Kensal Green Cemetery)

References

Further reading 
 
 Finkelstein, David, The House of Blackwood: Author-Publisher Relations in the Victorian Era, Penn State Press, 2001

External links 
Blackwood's Edinburgh Magazine, January, 1843 at Project Gutenberg
Blackwood's Edinburgh Magazine, February, 1843 at Project Gutenberg
Blackwood's Edinburgh Magazine, March, 1843 at Project Gutenberg
Blackwood's Edinburgh Magazine, April 1843 at Project Gutenberg
Blackwood's Edinburgh Magazine, May, 1843 at Project Gutenberg
Blackwood's Edinburgh Magazine, June, 1843 at Project Gutenberg
Blackwood's Edinburgh Magazine, January, 1844 at Project Gutenberg
Blackwood's Edinburgh Magazine, April, 1844 at Project Gutenberg
Blackwood's Edinburgh Magazine, July, 1844 at Project Gutenberg

1776 births
1834 deaths
Burials at Old Calton Burial Ground
Scottish booksellers
Blackwood family (publishers)
Scottish magazine publishers (people)
British magazine founders
Scottish printers
Publishers (people) from Edinburgh
18th-century Scottish people
19th-century Scottish businesspeople